Zirconium(IV) bromide is the inorganic compound with the formula ZrBr4. This colourless solid is the principal precursor to other Zr–Br compounds.

Preparation and properties
ZrBr4 is prepared by the action of bromine on zirconium oxide via a carbothermic reaction:
 ZrO2  +  2C +  2Br2   →   ZrBr4  +  2CO
Like many related tetrahalides, it is purified by sublimation.

It can also be prepared by treatment of the borohydride complex with hydrogen bromide:
 Zr(BH4)4  +  4HBr   →   ZrBr4  +  4H2  + 2B2H6

Like related tetrabromides of Ti and Hf, ZrBr4 hydrolyzes readily to give oxy-bromide, with release of hydrogen bromide.

Structure
No single crystal X-ray study of ZrBr4 has been described. Some reports suggest that it is isostructural with TiCl4 and  TiBr4, featuring tetrahedral metal centers.  Other studies indicate a polymeric structure.  ZrCl4 is polymeric in the solid state, featuring octahedral Zr centers.

References

Bromides
Zirconium(IV) compounds
Metal halides